The 1961 Hamilton Tiger-Cats season was the fourth season for the team in the Canadian Football League and their 12th overall. The team finished in first place in the Eastern Football Conference with a 10–4 record and faced the Winnipeg Blue Bombers in the Grey Cup for the fourth time in the last five seasons. The Tiger-Cats lost the 49th Grey Cup game by a score of 21–14 and was the first Grey Cup game to be decided in overtime.

Notably, this was the first season to introduce a regular season interlocking schedule with the Western Interprovincial Football Union teams. The Tiger-Cats had a 5–0 record in these games and therefore won the first regular season meeting against each of the CFL's Western teams. The club also played an exhibition game against the American Football League's Buffalo Bills where the Tiger-Cats won 38–21. It was the first meeting between a CFL team and an AFL team and it was the only time a CFL team had defeated a team from the present day's National Football League. This was also the last time that a CFL team played an NFL or an AFL team.

Exhibition

Regular season

Season Standings

Season schedule

Post-season

Schedule

References

Hamilton Tiger-cats Season, 1961
Hamilton Tiger-Cats seasons
James S. Dixon Trophy championship seasons
Hamilton Tiger-Cats